Hymenophyllum cupressiforme is a southern hemisphere species of filmy fern. Found in moist sheltered areas, in or near rainforests. Occasionally found in drier protected areas. Leaves one cell thick. A small epiphytic fern found on tree trunks, rocks and fallen logs.

Fronds are 2 to 9 cm long, the main stem is not winged. The main leaf is branched and toothed. 0.5 to 6 cm long and 1.5 to 2.5 cm wide.

References

cupressiforme
Epiphytes
Flora of New South Wales
Flora of Tasmania
Flora of Queensland
Flora of Victoria (Australia)
Flora of New Zealand